The 10th European Badminton Championships were held in Uppsala, Sweden, between 30 March and 5 April 1986, and hosted by the European Badminton Union and the Svenska Badmintonförbundet.

Medalists

Results

Semi-finals

Finals

Medal account

References
Results at BE

European Badminton Championships
European Badminton Championships
B
B
Badminton tournaments in Sweden
Sports competitions in Uppsala
European Badminton Championships
European Badminton Championships